The Tootinaowaziibeeng Treaty Reserve is a First Nation located 35 km east of Roblin, Manitoba, 74 km west of Dauphin, Manitoba, and approximately 5 km north of PTH #5. Tootinaowaziibeeng is a Treaty 4 First Nation. 

Its main reserve is Valley River 63A, which is bordered by the Rural Municipalities of Grandview and Hillsburg, as well as by the Duck Mountain Provincial Forest on its north side. The Valley River runs through the First Nation starting in the northwestern corner and exiting at the southeast. 

The total population of the First Nation is approximately 1600, of which about half are at the Valley River reserve and the remainder at various locations off-reserve.

Valley River 63A 
Valley River 63A is the main reserve of Tootinaowaziibeeng Treaty Reserve.

It is bordered by the municipalities of Grandview and Roblin, as well as by the Duck Mountain Provincial Forest on its north side. The Valley River runs through the community, starting in the northwestern corner and exiting at the southeast.

References

External links 
 Map of Valley River 63A at Statcan
INAC - Tootinaowaziibeeng Treaty Reserve First Nation

West Region Tribal Council
First Nations governments in Manitoba